The Young Guard (translit. Molodaya Gvardiya) is a two-part 1948 Soviet film directed by Sergei Gerasimov and based on the novel of the same title by Alexander Fadeyev. In 1949 a Stalin Prize for this film was awarded to Gerasimov, cinematographer Vladimir Rapoport, and the group of leading actors.

The film was also the highest grossing Soviet film of 1948, with approximately 48,600,000 tickets sold.

Synopsis
The film is set in July 1942 during The Great Patriotic War. Part of the Red Army leaves the mining town Krasnodon. After that, the city gets occupied by the German troops. Enemy machines destroy their path and members of the Komsomol group are forced to return home. In response to the atrocities of the invaders, the young Komsomol members, who are former students, create an underground anti-fascist Komsomol organization Young Guard. This organization leads a covert war against the occupation forces; young men spread antifascist leaflets, free a group of Red Army prisoners, burn the German stock exchange, thus saving their countrymen from being sent to work in Germany. On the day of the Red October anniversary, the young guards hang red Soviet flags.

Cast
 Vladimir Ivanov as Oleg Koshevoy
 Inna Makarova as  Lyubov Shevtsova
 Nonna Mordyukova as Uliana Gromova
 Sergei Gurzo as Sergei Tyulenin
 Lyudmila Shagalova as Valeriya Borts
 Viktor Khokhryakov as Commander Protzenko
 Viktor Avdyushko as worker
 Aleksandr Antonov as Ignat Fomin, Hilfspolizei
 Yevgeny Morgunov as Evgeny Stakhovich 
 Sergey Bondarchuk as Andrey Valko
 Muza Krepkogorskaya as Lazarenko

References

External links

1948 films
1940s Russian-language films
Gorky Film Studio films
Soviet black-and-white films
Films directed by Sergei Gerasimov
Films based on Russian novels
Soviet World War II films
Films scored by Dmitri Shostakovich
Soviet war drama films
1940s war drama films
1948 drama films
Films set in 1942